Lawrence Vidya Bhawan is a co-educational school located at Rajbagh in Srinagar, Jammu & Kashmir.

History
LVB is part of the Lawrence Group of Schools. The branch at Rajbagh was opened in the year 1995. During 2014, the second branch was opened in Noor Nagar,Ali jan Road.

Education
The school has four departments that provide co-ed classes from Nursery to 10th.

References

Schools in Srinagar
High schools and secondary schools in Jammu and Kashmir
Educational institutions established in 1995
1995 establishments in Jammu and Kashmir